is a Japanese former professional basketball player and coach. He was selected by the Golden State Warriors as the 171st pick of the eighth round of the 1981 NBA draft, although he did not sign with them. At 7'8" (233 cm), he is the tallest player to be drafted in National Basketball Association (NBA) history. Okayama was the only player from Japan drafted in the NBA until Rui Hachimura was selected in the 2019 NBA draft.

Okayama practiced judo at junior high school and high school, and obtained a second degree black belt. He started playing basketball when he was eighteen at Osaka University of Commerce. After graduation, he joined the Sumitomo Metal Sparks basketball club. He represented Japan between 1979 and 1986 before he retired in 1996. As of 2005, he worked for Sumitomo Metal Industries and was active as a basketball coach.

Okayama wrote a book for young basketball players in 1989.

See also

Rui Hachimura
Wataru Misaka
Yuta Tabuse

References

1954 births
Living people
Asian Games bronze medalists for Japan
Asian Games medalists in basketball
Basketball players at the 1982 Asian Games
Golden State Warriors draft picks
Japanese basketball coaches
Japanese men's basketball players
Medalists at the 1982 Asian Games
Sportspeople from Kumamoto Prefecture
Centers (basketball)
People with gigantism
University of Portland alumni